William Barney White (June 25, 1923 – July 24, 2002), nicknamed "Bear", was an American infielder in Major League Baseball who played four games during the  season for the Brooklyn Dodgers. Born in Paris, Texas, he died at age 79 in Tyler, Texas.

External links

1923 births
2002 deaths
Major League Baseball infielders
Brooklyn Dodgers players
Baseball players from Texas
People from Paris, Texas
Minor league baseball managers
Mobile Bears players
Fort Worth Cats players
Tulsa Oilers (baseball) players
Paris Rockets players
Temple Eagles players
Galveston White Caps players
Texas City Pilots players
Thibodaux Pilots players